Ajang  is a small village in the state of Maharashtra, India. It is located in the Dhule taluka of Dhule District in Maharashtra.

Demographics
The village of Ajang has an extremely high ratio of resident dentists, compared to other villages in the region.

See also 
 Dhule District
 List of villages in Dhule District
 List of districts of Maharashtra
 Maharashtra

References 
 1. Census Of India: 2001: Population for Village Code 152700
 2. Government of India: Ministry of Panchayati Raj

Villages in Dhule taluka
Villages in Dhule district